Margaret Caroline Tait (11 November 1918 – 16 April 1999) was a Scottish medical doctor, filmmaker and poet.

Early life and education
Tait was born and raised in Kirkwall, in the Orkney Islands in the north of Scotland, before being sent to school in Edinburgh.

Tait attended the University of Edinburgh, gaining qualifications in medicine upon her graduation in 1941. Between 1943 and 1946 she served in the Royal Army Medical Corps, where she was stationed variously in India, Sri Lanka and Malaya. Following her service, she moved to Rome in 1950 to study filmmaking at the Centro Sperimentale di Cinematografia.

Career
After completing her studies in Italy, Tait returned to Scotland in 1952, where she lived on Rose Street in Edinburgh and founded Ancona Films, named after the street where she had lodged while studying in Rome. During this period she was close to, though not a member of, the Edinburgh-based Rose Street Poets, whose ranks included Hugh MacDiarmid, Sorley Maclean and Norman MacCaig. From 1955 to 1961 she was a member of the ruling council of the influential Edinburgh conservationist body the Cockburn Association.

In the mid-1960s she lived near Helmsdale in Sutherland, before returning to Orkney. In the late 1960s she began to make films which took inspiration from the landscape and culture of the islands. She subsequently made the majority of her 32 short films and one full-length film, Blue Black Permanent, in Orkney. She also wrote prose and poetry, publishing three books of verse: origins and elements, The Hen and the Bees, and Subjects and Sequences. In the documentary Margaret Tait: Film Maker, produced for Channel Four Television in 1983, Tait would describe her life’s work as making ‘film poems’.

Her interest in poetry was often reflected in her films. The Leaden Echo and the Golden Echo is named after the poem by Gerard Manley Hopkins, and features Tait herself reading it; Hugh MacDiarmid, A Portrait featured the poet, who reads from several of his own poems; and in the title and content of her film Colour Poems of which she wrote "A poem started in words is continued in images." [Subjects and Sequences: a Margaret Tait Reader, LUX, London, 2004. p 164]. Much analysis of Tait's work also foregrounds their lyrical qualities. Writer Ali Smith wrote of her film Aerial: "Here's a tiny poem of the relentlessness and beauty of the natural, all around us.". Fellow Orcadian, writer George MacKay Brown, wrote that her film Place of Work "calls to mind T. S. Eliot's poem Burnt Norton: Garden and house, a small enclave in time where gracious and lovely and stirring things have happened – love and birth and death.’

Death and legacy
Tait died 16 April 1999 at the home she shared with her husband Alex Pirie on Orkney. An annual Margaret Tait Award was established in 2010 in conjunction with Glasgow Film Festival.

Retrospectives of Tait's work took place at the National Film Theatre London in 2000, curated by Benjamin Cook and Peter Todd, at the Edinburgh Film Festival in 2004, and at BFI Southbank (NFT) London in 2018, both curated by Todd. The 2018 retrospective was part of a year-long celebration of her life and work, with screenings, exhibitions, talks and other events with Sarah Neely as the director, supported by Creative Scotland. Centenary exhibitions devoted to her work were held at the GoMA Glasgow and The Pier Arts Centre in Orkney. 

In February 2020 Historic Environment Scotland announced Tait would be included in the Commemorative plaque scheme.The plaque was unveiled on 14 July 2022 at 25 Broad Street, Kirkwall.

Her work was introduced to many new audiences with the international film tour of her work Subjects and Sequences (named after her book of poems). Made up of two programmes of films, newly struck on 16mm film from the original 16mm negatives, the first titled Film Poems, and the second Islands, and curated by Peter Todd for LUX it was launched on 16 November 2004 with a screening at Cecil Sharp House, London. Subjects and Sequences A LUX Project was made possible by funding from Arts Council England, Scottish Screen, Esmée Fairbairn Foundation, & Pier Arts Centre. Over the next three years it would be presented at over thirty screenings including Watershed Bristol, Dundee Contemporary Arts, Scratch Projections Paris, Dartington Arts, Chapter Cardiff, Cinematexas Austin, Museum of Modern Art New York, Mumbai International Film Festival, Kino Arsenal Berlin, National Screen and Sound Archive of Wales, Harvard Film Archive, Greek Film Archive Athens.

The latter half of 2022 would see acknowledgement and the influence of Tait on fellow artists and filmmakers continue.  The exhibition Being in a Place – A Portrait of Margaret Tait opened in September at the VOID Gallery, Derry. It also saw the premiere of a film about Tait by Luke Fowler, from which the exhibition took its name. A second exhibition featuring the film opened later at The Modern Institute, Glasgow  in November 2022. Both exhibitions presented the film, with works from the Tait archive. Her films remain in distribution in the UK. Fowler's film Being in a Place will be shown in the Forum section of the 73rd Berlin International Film Festival (2023) in competition for the Caligari Filmpreis.

In November the film Aftersun directed by Charlotte Wells  was released, which took direct influence from Tait's work. Wells acknowledged the impact of Tait on her work, particularly the film Blue Black Permanent which also centres around childhood memories of a now-absent parent, as experienced in the present.

Filmography
One Is One (1951)
Three Portrait Sketches (1951)
The Lion, The Griffin and the Kangaroo (1952)
Happy Bees (1955)
Orquil Burn (1955)
A Portrait of Ga (1955)
The Leaden Echo and the Golden Echo (1955)
Calypso (1956)
The Drift Back (1956)
Rose Street (1956)
Where I Am Is Here (1964)
Palindrome (1964)
Hugh Macdiarmid: A Portrait (1964)
The Big Sheep (1966)
Splashing (1966)
A Pleasant Place (1969)
He's Back (The Return) (1970)
John MacFadyen (The Stripes in the Tartan) (1970)
Painted Eightsome (1970)
On The Mountain (1974)
Colour Poems (1974)
Aerial (1974)
These Walls (1974)
Tailpiece (1976)
Place of Work (1976)
Aspects of Kirkwall : Shape of a Town (1977)
Aspects of Kirkwall : Occasions (1977)
Aspects of Kirkwall : The Ba, Over the Years (1981)
Aspects of Kirkwall : The Look of the Place (1981)
Aspects of Kirkwall : Some Changes (1981)
Landmakar (1981)
Blue Black Permanent (1992) (Feature)
Garden Pieces (1998)

Selected works
 The Grassy Stories: Short Stories from Children (Edinburgh: M.C. Tait, 1959)
 Lane Furniture: A Book of Stories (Edinburgh: M.C. Tait, 1959)
 origins and elements (Edinburgh: M.C. Tait, 1959)
 The Hen and the Bees: Legends and Lyrics (Edinburgh: M.C. Tait, 1960)
 Subjects and Sequences (Edinburgh: M.C. Tait, 1960)
 Poems, Stories and Writings, edited by Sarah Neely (Manchester: Carcanet Press, 2012)
 Subjects and Sequences: A Margaret Tait Reader, edited by Peter Todd and Benjamin Cook (London: LUX, 2004)

References

External links
National Library of Scotland, Moving Image Archive Biography of Margaret Tait with links to film details and clips)
Scottish Poetry Library (Biography of Margaret Tait, recordings of her reading her poetry, and links to poem texts)
Preserving the Hand-Painted Films of Margaret Tait, (MA Dissertation), Joss Winn, 2002

1918 births
1999 deaths
Scottish women poets
Scottish women film directors
Centro Sperimentale di Cinematografia alumni
People from Kirkwall
Alumni of the University of Edinburgh
20th-century British women writers
20th-century Scottish poets
Royal Army Medical Corps officers
Women in the British Army
British Army personnel of World War II
20th-century Scottish medical doctors
Scottish women medical doctors
20th-century Scottish women